The 1927 Texas A&M Aggies football team was an American football team that represented Texas A&M University in the Southwest Conference during the 1927 college football season. In their tenth season under head coach Dana X. Bible, the Aggies compiled an 8–0–1 record (4–0–1 against conference opponents), shut out five of nine opponents, and outscored all opponents by a total of 262 to 32.

There was no contemporaneous system in 1927 for determining a national champion. However, Texas A&M was retroactively named as the national champion for 1927 by Jeff Sagarin. Most selectors have named either Illinois or Georgia as the 1927 national champion. The team was ranked No. 11 in the nation in the Dickinson System ratings released in December 1927.

Two persons affiliated with the team were later inducted into the College Football Hall of Fame: coach Bible (inducted 1951); and quarterback Joel Hunt (inducted in 1967). Seven Texas A&M players were selected as first-team players on the 1927 All-Southwest Conference football team: Hunt; end Jules V. Sikes; tackles Lister and Sprott; guards Klepto Holmes and Figari; and center Bartlett.

Schedule

References

Texas AandM
Texas A&M Aggies football seasons
College football national champions
Southwest Conference football champion seasons
College football undefeated seasons
Texas AandM